Wild Like Children is the debut album by Tilly and the Wall. The album was recorded in the basement of Steve Pedersen's house, and was the first release of Team Love Records. 
The CD-release party for the album was held in Omaha, Nebraska on July 3, 2004.

The album was released in Australia on December 2, 2006.

Track listing
 "Fell Down the Stairs" – 2:20
 "Nights of the Living Dead" – 3:55
 "Bessa" – 2:38
 "You and I Misbehaving" – 4:16
 "Reckless" – 2:50
 "Let It Rain" – 3:55
 "Shake It Out" – 4:05
 "A Perfect Fit" – 3:19
 "I Always Knew" – 3:10
 "The Ice Storm, Big Gust, and You" – 14:23
+ hidden track (dubbed "Some Names" by fans), CD-only

External links
Tilly and the Wall official website
Tilly and the Wall on MySpace
Team Love Records

2004 debut albums
Team Love Records albums
Tilly and the Wall albums